"The Birth of the Blues" is a popular 1926 song composed by Ray Henderson, with lyrics by Buddy DeSylva and Lew Brown. It was used in the Broadway revue George White's Scandals of 1926.
It was recorded in its debut year by Paul Whiteman (with vocals by Jack Fulton, Charles Gaylord and Austin "Skin" Young), Harry Richman, and The Revelers.

In popular culture
1941 Birth of the Blues - sung by Bing Crosby
1948 When My Baby Smiles at Me
1951 Painting the Clouds with Sunshine
1956 The Best Things in Life Are Free - danced by Sheree North and Jacques d'Amboise
It is featured in Season 3 of House of Cards, where it is performed by President Frank Underwood, played by Kevin Spacey.

References 

1926 songs
Al Hirt songs
Frank Sinatra songs
Sammy Davis Jr. songs
Songs with lyrics by Lew Brown
Songs with lyrics by Buddy DeSylva
Songs with music by Ray Henderson
Songs about blues